William Johnson, D.D. (18 October 1642 – 2 February 1698) was an Anglican priest.

Johnson was born in Sedgeberrow and educated at The Queen's College, Oxford. 
He was appointed Chaplain to Herbert Croft, Bishop of Hereford in 1668; and Canon Residentiary of Hereford Cathedral in 1669. Johnson held livings at Croft, Whitbourne and Clifton. He was Archdeacon of Hereford from 1690 until his death in 1698.

References

Archdeacons of Hereford
1642 births
1698 deaths
Alumni of The Queen's College, Oxford
Clergy from Worcestershire
People from Wychavon (district)